Hotbox or hot box may refer to: 
 a hotbed (gardening) that is enclosed in a box with a glass or clear plastic lid 
 Hot box, an overheated journal box on a railroad car
 Hot box (game), a half-court flying disc sport with a very small box-shaped scoring area
 Hotbox (baseball), also known as the rundown, is a running/fielding/throwing drill in baseball training
 Hot Box (appliance), an improvised appliance to heat up food, usually with incandescent light bulbs as the heat source
 Hotbox (TV series), a Canadian sketch comedy show named for the marijuana/hash smoking practice
 Box (torture), also called a hot box, a form of torture and penal punishment by imprisoning a person in an overheated room, cell or cage
 A hotbox, a pressure washer accessory, powered by oil, gas or electricity, used to heat water before it is sprayed from the washer
 Hotboxing, smoking marijuana or hashish in a small enclosed area, causing it to fill with smoke in order to maximize the effect
 The Hot Box, a fictional nightclub from the musical Guys and Dolls
 an enclosure used for beef aging
 a guarded hot box, a laboratory apparatus used to measure thermal transmission properties of building materials, including thermal insulation